Ouled Attia is a district in Skikda Province, Algeria, on the western Mediterranean Sea coastline of the province. It is one of the less densely populated districts of the province. It was named after its capital, Ouled Attia.

Municipalities
The district is further divided into 3 municipalities:
Ouled Attia
Oued Z'Hour
Khenak Mayoune

Districts of Skikda Province